Reiherbach may refer to:

Reiherbach (Weser), a river of  Lower Saxony, Germany, tributary of the Weser
Reiherbach (Lutter), a river of North Rhine-Westphalia, Germany, tributary of the Lutter
Reiherbach (Edersee), a river of Hesse, Germany, tributary of the Edersee